Sandeep Singh (born 18 February 1981) is an Indian first-class cricketer who plays for Vidarbha.

References

External links
 

1981 births
Living people
Indian cricketers
Vidarbha cricketers
Cricketers from Nagpur